Rainbow Wendover is a hotel and casino located in West Wendover, Nevada. This casino as well as the Peppermill and the Montego Bay are owned and operated by Peppermill Casinos, Inc.

History
The casino at this location was formerly known as the Nevada Crossing Casino. It was purchased by Peppermill Casinos in 1996, was expanded and remodeled and re-opened.

References

Casino hotels
Casinos completed in 1982
Casinos in West Wendover, Nevada
Hotel buildings completed in 1982
Hotels in Nevada